Eugène Louis Marie Léon Gingembre (30 June 1875 – 13 October 1928) was a French cyclist. He competed in the men's 25 kilometres event at the 1900 Summer Olympics.

References

External links
 

1875 births
1928 deaths
French male cyclists
Olympic cyclists of France
Cyclists at the 1900 Summer Olympics
Cyclists from Paris